The 1925–26 Swiss International Ice Hockey Championship was the 11th edition of the international ice hockey championship in Switzerland. The championship was not awarded, as the final between HC Rosey Gstaad and HC Davos was not contested.

First round

Eastern Series 
HC St. Moritz - HC Davos 1:4

HC Davos qualified for the final.

Western Series 
HC Rosey Gstaad - HC Château-d'Oex 5:1

HC Rosey Gstaad qualified for the final.

Final 
 HC Rosey Gstaad - HC Davos 0:0 (not played)

External links 
Swiss Ice Hockey Federation – All-time results

Inter
Swiss International Ice Hockey Championship seasons